Lotarevka is a rural locality (a settlement) in Soldatsky Selsoviet Rural Settlement, Fatezhsky District, Kursk Oblast, Russia. The population as of 2010 is 7.

Geography 
The settlement is located on the Nikovets River (a right tributary of the Ruda in the basin of the Svapa), 96 km from the Russia–Ukraine border, 38 km north-west of Kursk, 14 km south-west of the district center – the town Fatezh, 13 km from the selsoviet center – Soldatskoye.

Climate
Lotarevka has a warm-summer humid continental climate (Dfb in the Köppen climate classification).

Transport 
Lotarevka is located 9.5 km from the federal route  Crimea Highway as part of the European route E105, 15 km from the road of regional importance  (Fatezh – Dmitriyev), 3 km from the road of intermunicipal significance  (Alisovo-Pokrovskoye – Kofanovka), 34 km from the nearest railway halt 552 km (railway line Navlya – Lgov-Kiyevsky).

The rural locality is situated 41 km from Kursk Vostochny Airport, 155 km from Belgorod International Airport and 237 km from Voronezh Peter the Great Airport.

References

Notes

Sources

Rural localities in Fatezhsky District